A referendum on the territory's status was held in Guam on 4 September 1976. Voters were presented with a range of options, with "improved status quo" receiving the support of 58%.

Results

References

1976 referendums
1976 in Guam
Referendums in Guam
Independence referendums